The 2016–17 National League 2 North is the eighth season (30th overall) of the fourth tier (north) of the English domestic rugby union competitions since the professionalised format of the second division was introduced. New teams to the division include Wharfedale who were relegated from National League 1 while Sheffield Tigers were promoted as champions of National League 3 North along with Scunthorpe (champions) and Hinckley (play-off) from National League 3 Midlands.  

Caldy were crowned champions on the 8 April 2017 with two games to go, after beating second place Sale 28–26 in front of a crowd of 1,432 at Paton Field (the biggest in the league that season) to make sure that the Heywood Road side could not catch them.  It was the first time Caldy had won National League 2 North and the highest level they have reached in the club's history. Up until the last few games, Sale had been neck and neck with Caldy but in the end two defeats to the Wirral-based club meant that they finished 9 points adrift in second place. However, a strong finish by Sale meant that they would go into the promotion play-off against the runner-up from the 2016–17 National League 2 South, Old Elthamians, with home advantage as they gained more league points (124) than the southern based side (122). Despite home advantage Sale were unable to join Caldy in the 2017–18 National League 1 as they lost a close game 14–19 to Old Elthamians in front of a crowd of 1,297 at Heywood Road.

The liquidation of London Welsh in January 2017, and their expulsion from the RFU Championship, meant that there were only five teams relegated from National League 2 South and National League 2 North this season – meaning that one league would have three teams going down and the other having just two depending on league points at the end of the season.  On the same day that Caldy won the league title, Preston Grasshoppers were the first team to be relegated, losing 32–48 to relegation rivals Harrogate and ending the club's 12-year stay in the division.  

The battle for the other relegation places was much closer as on the last day of the season three sides could still go down. In the end it was Harrogate and newly promoted Scunthorpe who were relegated as both teams lost their matches, while another newly promoted side, Sheffield Tigers, won theirs.  With regards to the Tigers, who at one point looked likely to go down, they had an absolute fantastic finish to the season, winning four out of five games to remain in National League 2 North. There had been some hope that the 14th placed team might have been kept safe but the equivalent side in the 2016–17 National League 2 South, Barnstaple, escaped relegation as they gained more points (51) than their northern counterparts (47). Following their relegation, Preston Grasshoppers and Harrogate will start next season in National League 3 North, while Scunthorpe will drop back down to National League 3 Midlands.  

There were other points to contemplate at the end of the campaign.  Attendances in National League 2 North were very good this season - up to 78,160 (or 326 per game) from 65,338 (273 per game) the previous year - which was the best support since the 2013-14 campaign when sides such as Darlington Mowden Park were taking part.  This was mostly due to the consistent support which went to watch Wharfedale, Tynedale and Hinckley (two of whom were new to the division), along with several good individual attendances at both Caldy and Sale who benefited from being involved in a tightly contested title battle.  A second point of note went to Nick Royle of Caldy who had another record breaking campaign.  Firstly, his 32 tries equaled a season best for the division (Gareth Collins and Royle himself had previously achieved this),and secondly he finished as the top try scorer in the division for the third time in his career - a National League 2 North record.  Finally, another record was equaled in the division by Wharfedale's Tom Barrett, who scored 3 drop kicks in a game - twice during the season.

Structure
The league consists of sixteen teams with all the teams playing each other on a home and away basis to make a total of thirty matches each. There is one automatic promotion place, one play-off place and three relegation places. The champions are promoted to the 2017–18 National League 1 and the runner-up play the second-placed team in the 2016–17 National League 2 South with the winner also being promoted. The last three teams are relegated to either National League 3 North or National League 3 Midlands depending on the geographical location of the team (in some cases teams may join the southern regional leagues).

The results of the matches contribute points to the league as follows:
 4 points are awarded for a win
 2 points are awarded for a draw
 0 points are awarded for a loss, however
 1 losing (bonus) point is awarded to a team that loses a match by 7 points or fewer
 1 additional (bonus) point is awarded to a team scoring 4 tries or more in a match.

Participating teams and locations
Eleven of the teams listed below participated in the 2015–16 National League 2 North season; Wharfedale were relegated from the 2015–16 National League 1 while Sheffield Tigers were promoted as champions of National League 3 North and Scunthorpe (champions) and Hinckley came up from National League 3 Midlands.

League table

Results

Round 1

Round 2

Round 3

Round 4

Round 5

Round 6

Round 7

Round 8

Round 9

Round 10

Round 11

Round 12

Round 13
 
 
 
 
 
 
 
 
Postponed due to frozen pitch.  Game to be rescheduled for 25 February 2017.

Round 14

Round 15

Round 16

Round 17

Round 18
 
 
 
 
Postponed due to frozen pitch.  Game to be rescheduled for 25 February 2017.

Round 19

Round 20

Round 21

Round 22

Round 23

Rounds 13 & 18 (rescheduled games) 

Game rescheduled from 14 January 2017.

Game rescheduled from 26 November 2016.

Round 24

Round 25

Round 26

Round 27

Round 28 

Preston Grasshoppers are relegated.

Caldy are champions.

Round 29

Round 30 

Scunthorpe are relegated.

Harrogate are relegated.

Promotion play-off
Each season, the runners-up in the National League 2 North and National League 2 South participate in a play-off for promotion to National Division 1. Sale finished second in the 2016–17 National League 2 North and because they had a better record than the 2016–17 National League 2 South runners-up, Old Elthamians, they hosted the play-off match.

Attendances
 Does not include promotion play-off.

Individual statistics
 Note that points scorers includes tries as well as conversions, penalties and drop goals. Appearance figures also include coming on as substitutes (unused substitutes not included).  Does not include promotion playoff.

Top points scorers

Top try scorers

Season records

Team
Largest home win — 53 points
67 – 14 Sedgley Park at home to Scunthorpe on 3 December 2016
Largest away win — 54 points
61 - 7 Sale away to Scunthorpe on 4 March 2017
Most points scored — 76 points
76 - 35 Sedgley Park at home to Luctonians on 15 October 2016
Most tries in a match — 12
Sedgley Park at home to Luctonians on 15 October 2016
Most conversions in a match — 9
Sale at home to Wharfedale on 11 March 2017
Most penalties in a match — 6
Scunthorpe away to Harrogate on 22 October 2016
Most drop goals in a match — 3 (x2)
Wharfedale at home to Scunthorpe on 19 November 2016
Wharfedale at home to Luctonians on 28 January 2017

Player
Most points in a match — 37
 Jack Lavin for Caldy at home to Preston Grasshoppers on 14 January 2017
Most tries in a match — 5 (x3)
 Johnny Matthews for Sedgley Park at home to Luctonians on 15 October 2016
 Andrew Riley for Sedgley Park at home to Scunthorpe on 3 December 2016
 Jack Lavin for Caldy at home to Preston Grasshoppers on 14 January 2017
Most conversions in a match — 9
 Luke McGovern for Sale at home to Wharfedale on 11 March 2017
Most penalties in a match — 6
 Steve Johnson for Scunthorpe away to Harrogate on 22 October 2016
Most drop goals in a match — 3 (x2)
 Tom Barrett for Wharfedale at home to Scunthorpe on 19 November 2016
 Tom Barrett for Wharfedale at home to Luctonians on 28 January 2017

Attendances
Highest — 1,432
Caldy at home to Sale on 8 April 2017
Lowest — 50
South Leicester at home to Caldy on 22 October 2016
Highest Average Attendance — 493
Wharfedale
Lowest Average Attendance — 99
South Leicester

See also
 English rugby union system
 Rugby union in England

References

External links
 NCA Rugby

2016–17
2016–17 in English rugby union leagues